The Paramount Theatre is a 2,807-seat performing arts venue located at 9th Avenue and Pine Street in Seattle, Washington, United States. The theater originally opened on March 1, 1928, as the Seattle Theatre, with 3,000 seats. It was placed on the National Register of Historic Places on October 9, 1974, and has also been designated a City of Seattle landmark.

The Paramount is owned and operated by the Seattle Theatre Group, a 501(c)(3) not-for-profit performing arts organization which also runs the 1,768-seat Moore Theatre in Belltown and the Neptune Theatre in the University District. Initially it was built expressly for showing film and secondarily, vaudeville. As of 2009, the Paramount is operated as a venue for various performing arts, serving its patron base with Broadway theatre, concerts, dance, comedy, family engagements, silent film and jazz. It is one of the busiest theatres in the region.

History
During the roaring twenties, particularly before the first "talkies" were invented in 1927, vaudeville and silent movies were the dominant form of national and local entertainment. Seattle alone had more than 50 movie palaces, the finest grouped together on 2nd Avenue. To achieve the broadest possible distribution of its films, Hollywood-based Paramount Pictures constructed a grand movie palace in practically every major city in the country, many erected between 1926 and 1928. In late 1926 or early 1927, Paramount Pictures decided to build in Seattle.

Led by its president, Hungarian-born movie magnate Adolph Zukor, Paramount Pictures invested the nearly $3 million required for construction. It hired Rapp & Rapp, a Chicago-based architectural firm that built theatres around the country, to design the theatre building. Scottish-born Seattle resident B. Marcus Priteca, America's most celebrated architect of movie palaces in the 1920s, designed the building's adjacent apartments and office suites.

The Rapp brothers began with a substantial handicap: the land for the new theatre was situated on 9th Avenue, blocks from the center of Seattle's theatre district, and the land was no more than a ravine with a creek flowing to nearby Lake Union. After filling in the land, Paramount Pictures compensated for its new theatre's remote location by building the largest, most spectacular, most opulent movie palace Seattle had ever seen. On March 1, 1928, the Seattle Theatre opened. The Seattle Times heralded the occasion with enthusiasm:

Eager customers responded on opening night, lining up eight abreast outside The Seattle. After paying the 50 cent admission fee, they entered the grand lobby. There patrons encountered a lavish interior decorated in the Beaux Arts (also called French Renaissance) style of the palace in Versailles. They were awed by the four-tiered lobby, French baroque plaster moldings, gold-leaf encrusted wall medallions, rich paint colors, beaded chandeliers, and lacy ironwork. Their feet sank into hand-loomed French carpeting as they walked past walls adorned with delicate tapestries and original paintings in gilded frames. Heavy, expensive draperies fell at the windows, and hand-carved furniture upholstered in the finest fabrics lined the first-floor lobby.

Before entering the auditorium, customers were entertained by the rare gold and ivory Knabe Ampico grand player piano in the lounge area just above the foyer.

Patrons were escorted to their places in the nearly 4,000 seat auditorium by what the program booklet praised as an "alert, tactful, well trained" corps of ushers who provided "courteous, unostentatious service." The program promised "no fuss, no senseless genuflections, but ... welcome, quiet, considerate and alert attention on the part of each of these ushers — in other words, a gracious host making you feel that his home is yours, suavely, expeditiously, sincerely and without affectation."

The Paramount Theatre is the first venue in the United States to have a convertible floor system, which converts the theater to a ballroom. Therefore, the maximum concert capacity can hold up to 3,000 fans with the main floor serving as an unreserved standing room area while keeping the seats in the balcony regardless of either a 2,807-seated theater or a general admission event by separated levels.

The Paramount Theatre has an original installation Wurlitzer theatre pipe organ.  The organ is a 4 manual/21 rank Publix 1 style organ and is one of only three remaining original organs of this style. Jim Riggs has been the house organist for the Paramount, accompanying the Trader Joe's Silent Movie Mondays series.  The organ is presently maintained by a group of volunteers from the Puget Sound Theatre Organ Society.

It was renamed the Paramount in the 1930s. The Paramount Theatre on 45th Street was renamed the 45th Street Theatre and later the Guild 45th. (Source: Guild 45th, Cinema Treasures)

As of 2009, the Paramount has a new sign out front. The 1940s Paramount sign originally used 1,970 incandescent bulbs, which were eventually replaced by 11-watt fluorescents. The new sign is a replica of the original iconic sign, but uses LED lights. The Paramount Theatre was also used to hold televised auditions for the sixth season of America's Got Talent.

Notable performances
Pink Floyd performed at the venue as part of the Meddle Tour on October 22, 1971.
The Guess Who's 1972 album Live at the Paramount was recorded at the Paramount on May 2, 1972.
The Grateful Dead's performance, on July 21, 1972, were recorded and later released as a live album, entitled Download Series Volume 10.
Queen performed at the venue as part of the Sheer Heart Attack Tour on April 6, 1975.
Bob Marley and The Wailers performed at the Paramount Theatre on June 15, 1978, in support of his Kaya Tour and on November 20, 1979, in support of his Survival Tour.
Madonna performed her first concerts here, kicking off The Virgin Tour, on April 10, 1985, to three sold-out crowds.
On February 21, 1989, Neil Young and band 'the Restless' first publicly perform his song "Rockin' in the Free World".  
Anthrax, Exodus and Helloween kicked off the Headbangers Ball Tour at the theater on April 3, 1989.
Nirvana performed here on October 31, 1991. Several of the songs from this performance have been released on various Nirvana releases including the live compilation video Live! Tonight! Sold Out!!, the live album From the Muddy Banks of the Wishkah and their rarities box set With the Lights Out. However the show in its entirety was finally released in 2011 on DVD and Blu-ray as Live at the Paramount.
Tove Lo performed at the venue as part of the sold out Dirt Femme Tour on February 23, 2023.
Soundgarden's 1992 home video, Motorvision, was filmed at the Paramount Theatre.
Heart filmed their concert DVD Heart: Alive In Seattle August 8, 2002, at the Paramount Theatre. Heart: Alive In Seattle went certifiable platinum by the RIAA.
Tenacious D performed as part of their Pick of Destiny Tour on February 16 and 17th, 2007. Neil Hamburger opened for them. The shows were filmed for their 2008 concert DVD The Complete Master Works 2.

References

External links

 Paramount (Seattle) Theatre at HistoryLink

1920s architecture in the United States
B. Marcus Priteca buildings
Buildings and structures in Seattle
Cinemas and movie theaters in Washington (state)
Concert halls in the United States
Downtown Seattle
National Register of Historic Places in Seattle
Movie palaces
Music venues in Washington (state)
Public venues with a theatre organ
Theatres on the National Register of Historic Places in Washington (state)
Tourist attractions in Seattle